Bhairab(also known as Bhairab Bazar) is a city in central Bangladesh, located in Kishoreganj District in the division of Dhaka. It is administrative headquarter and urban centre of Bhairab Upazila. About 118,992 people live here which makes this city the largest in Kishoreganj District and 28th largest city in Bangladesh.

Geography

Demographics
According to 2011 Bangladesh census the total population of the city is 118,992 of which 60,284 are males and 58,708 are females with a density of 7,574 people per km2. The number of total household of the city is 24,057.

Administration
Bhairab city is governed by a Paurashava named Bhairab municipality which consists of 12 wards and 29 mahallas, which occupies an area of 15.71 km2.

References

Cities in Bangladesh
Populated places in Dhaka Division